The Bolivian National Road Championships are held annually to decide the cycling champions in both the road race and time trial discipline, across various categories.

Men

Road race

Time Trial

References

National road cycling championships
Cycle races in Bolivia
2002 establishments in Bolivia
Recurring sporting events established in 2002